Houston Fort Bend Airport  is a privately owned, public use airport located in unincorporated Fort Bend County, Texas, United States. It was formerly known as Happy Landings Airport.

Facilities

References

External links
 Houston Fort Bend (2H5) at Texas DOT Airport Directory
 

Airports in Texas
Airports in Greater Houston
Buildings and structures in Fort Bend County, Texas
Transportation in Fort Bend County, Texas